The 2010 Salford City Council election took place on 6 May 2010 to elect members of Salford City Council in England. One third of the council was up for election. This was on the same day as other local elections. The Labour Party gained three seats and stayed in overall control of the council.

The composition of the Council following the 2010 elections:

Ward results

Barton ward

Boothstown And Ellenbrook ward

Broughton ward

Cadishead ward

Claremont ward

Eccles ward

Irlam ward

Irwell Riverside ward

Kersal ward

Langworthy ward

Little Hulton ward

Ordsall ward

Pendlebury ward

Swinton North ward

Swinton South ward

Walkden North ward

Walkden South ward

Weaste & Seedley ward

Winton ward

Worsley ward

References

2010
2010 English local elections
2010s in Greater Manchester